Tall Ships America (TSA), previously known as the American Sail Training Association (ASTA), is the largest sail training association in the world and a founding member of Sail Training International. From starting with a handful of vessels sailing the New England waters, Tall Ships America has grown into an international institution with more than 250 tall ships and sail training vessels representing 25 different countries and navigating all the world's oceans. TSA was founded on April 3, 1973, by Barclay H. Warburton III, following his return from the Tall Ships Races in Europe in 1972 where he joined the USCGC Eagle with his brigantine Black Pearl as the first US vessels to participate in the races.

Mission
A nonprofit 501(c)(3) organization, Tall Ships America's mission is to
  encourage character building and seamanship through sail training
 promote sail training to the North American public
  support education under sail.

Tall Ships America organizes the Tall Ships Challenge, a series of sail training races, rallies and maritime festivals that rotate every three years around 
 the Atlantic Ocean
 the Pacific Ocean
 the Great Lakes and coasts of North America. 

In 2016, the Tall Ships Challenge series was held in the Great Lakes. In 2015, the series was held on the East Coast of the United States with stops in Cape Charles, Virginia, Philadelphia, PA/Camden, NJ, Greenport, Suffolk County, New York and Portland, Maine.

Member vessels
 member vessels include:

Awards
Every year TSA awards several prizes including:
 lifetime achievement
 leadership
 sail trainer of the year
 volunteer of the year
 Tall Ships Challenge awards

References 

Sail training associations
Yachting associations
 
Educational organizations based in the United States
1973 establishments in Rhode Island